

Just Beyond the River is the second studio album by James Yorkston and the Athletes. It was released in October 2004. The album was released on 12" vinyl and on CD, initial copies of the CD came with a 3-track CD of folk standards and original compositions, entitled Fearsome Fairytale Lovers. The album was produced by Kieran Hebden (aka Four Tet).

Track listing
"Heron"
"Shipwreckers"
"Surf Song"
"Hermitage"
"Hotel"
"This Time Tomorrow"
"Banjo #1"
"We Flew Blind"
"Edward" (traditional)
"Banjo #2"
"The Snow It Melts the Soonest" (traditional)

Fearsome Fairytale Lovers (Bonus CD)
"Lowlands Away" / "Don't Leave Home"
"Fearsome Fairytale Lover" / "Safe Havers"
"Under the Moon" / "Higher Germanie"

Personnel
James Yorkston – Banjo, bouzouki, guitar, arranger, concertina, vocals
Jon Bews – Fiddle, violin
Wendy Chan – Vocals, small pipes
Kieran Hebden – Slide guitar
Doogie Paul – Bass, bouzouki, percussion, glockenspiel, vocals
Faisal Rahman – Dulcimer, banjo, percussion
Holly Taylor – Whistling
Reuben Taylor – Piano, accordion, harpsichord, glass

Technical personnel
Matthew Cooper – Design
Sean Dooley – Design, photography
Kieran Hebden – Producer
Sean Mage – Mastering
David Wench – Engineer

External links
Domino Records minisite

2004 albums
Domino Recording Company albums
James Yorkston albums
Albums produced by Kieran Hebden